Alexander Chisholm (21 January 1887 – 17 December 1975) was Archdeacon of Carlisle from 1947
until 1958.

He was educated at Durham University, completing his licentiate in theology in 1911 as a member of Hatfield College. After a curacy at St Luke's, Bath he served incumbencies in Wedmore, Yeovil and Weston-super-Mare. He was Sub-Dean of Wells Cathedral before his Carlisle appointment.

References
 

 

1887 births
Alumni of Hatfield College, Durham
Archdeacons of Carlisle
1975 deaths
20th-century English Anglican priests